Stade Municipal Ndoumbe Oumar is a multi-use stadium in Ngaoundéré, Cameroon.  It is currently used mostly for football matches, on club level by Université FC de Ngaoundéré of the Elite One. The stadium has a capacity of 2,000 spectators.

References

Football venues in Cameroon